Alexander Wolf (born 21 December 1978) is a former German biathlete. At the 2008 World Championships in Östersund, he won bronze medals in the 12.5 km pursuit and the 4 × 7.5 km relay.

Biathlon results
All results are sourced from the International Biathlon Union.

Olympic Games

*Mass start was added as an event in 2006.

World Championships
2 medals (2 bronze)

*During Olympic seasons competitions are only held for those events not included in the Olympic program.
**The mixed relay was added as an event in 2005.

Individual victories
3 victories (3 Sp)

*Results are from UIPMB and IBU races which include the Biathlon World Cup, Biathlon World Championships and the Winter Olympic Games.

References

External links
  
 
 
 

1978 births
Living people
People from Schmalkalden
Sportspeople from Thuringia
German male biathletes
Biathletes at the 2002 Winter Olympics
Biathletes at the 2006 Winter Olympics
Biathletes at the 2010 Winter Olympics
Olympic biathletes of Germany
Biathlon World Championships medalists
21st-century German people